Clintondale Community Schools is a school district headquartered in Clinton Township, Michigan. It is well known for having the first high school in the nation to utilize a flipped classroom curriculum schoolwide.

Schools

Secondary schools
 Clintondale High School 
 Clintondale Middle School

Primary schools
 McGlinnen Elementary School
 Parker Elementary
 Rainbow Elementary

References

External links

Clintondale Community Schools Home Page

Education in Macomb County, Michigan
School districts in Michigan